The 1994 World Badminton Grand Prix was the 12th edition of the World Badminton Grand Prix finals. It was held in Bangkok, Thailand, from December 7 to December 11, 1994.

Final results

References
Smash: World Grand Prix Finals, Bangkok 1994

World Tour, Finals
Badminton, World Grand Prix, Finals
Badminton, World Grand Prix, Finals
World Tour, Finals
World Tour, Finals
World Badminton Grand Prix
Badminton, World Grand Prix, Finals